The 2017–18 India women's Tri-Nation Series was a cricket tournament that took place in India in March 2018. It was a tri-nation series between Australia women, England women and the India women cricket teams. The matches were played as Women's Twenty20 International (WT20I) fixtures, with the top two teams progressing to the final on 31 March 2018. Ahead of the WT20I fixtures, India A played two warm-up fixtures against England.

In the third match of the series, England's Jenny Gunn became the first player, male or female, to play in 100 Twenty20 International matches. In the fifth match, Australia's Meg Lanning became the first player for Australia, male or female, to score 2,000 runs in Twenty20 Internationals.

Australia Women and England Women qualified for the final, after India Women lost their first three matches of the series. In the final, Australia Women beat England Women by 57 runs to win the series. In the match, Australia Women scored 209 runs, the highest team total in a WT20I fixture. Australia Women also set a new record for the most fours scored in a Twenty20 International by any side, male or female, with 32 boundaries.

With nine wickets at an average of 12.33, the series leading wicket taker, Australian Megan Schutt, was named player of the series.

Squads

Tour matches

1st 20-over match: India A Women v England Women

2nd 20-over match: India A Women v England Women

Points table

WT20I series

1st WT20I

2nd WT20I

3rd WT20I

4th WT20I

5th WT20I

6th WT20I

Final

Notes

References

External links
 Series home at ESPN Cricinfo

2018 in English women's cricket
2017–18 Australian women's cricket season
2017–18 Indian women's cricket
International cricket competitions in 2017–18
International women's cricket competitions in India
Women's Twenty20 cricket international competitions